Tempyra is a genus of dirt-colored seed bugs in the family Rhyparochromidae. There are at least two described species in Tempyra.

Species
These two species belong to the genus Tempyra:
 Tempyra biguttula Stal, 1874
 Tempyra testacea Barber, 1948

References

External links

 

Rhyparochromidae
Articles created by Qbugbot
Pentatomomorpha genera